Wendy Moten is the debut album by American R&B singer Wendy Moten, released in 1992. It features the single "Come In Out of the Rain", which, although a minor hit on the US Billboard Hot 100, was an Adult Contemporary smash, peaking at number 5. It had similar success in the UK Singles Chart, where it peaked at number 8 when released in 1994. A second single from the album, "So Close to Love" also charted in the UK in 1994, peaking at number 35.

Critical reception

In a review for AllMusic, Steve Huey gave the album three out of five stars, saying that the album "displays a confident vocalist with a theatrical flair" and that "Moten is equally comfortable with urban R&B and smooth adult contemporary balladry, although her true affinity seems to be for the latter."

Track listing

Personnel and production
As adapted from the album's liner notes:
Track 1 – produced by Homemade Productions, with additional vocal production by Nikos Lyras. Recording Engineers: Barry Rudolph, Walter Balfour and Matt King. Mixed by Ben Grosse. Steve Dubin: drums, percussion; Tim Heintz: keyboards; Puff Johnson: background vocals 
Tracks 2, 3 and 5-11 – arranged, produced and recorded by Nikos Lyras for Thunderbird Records; with recording assistance on track 6 by Doug Night Wine, Ben Grosse on tracks 4, 7 and 11, Matt King on tracks 8 and 10 and Walter Balfour on tracks 10 and 11. Tracks 2, 3, 5, 6, 7, 9 and 11 mixed by Ben Grosse. Tracks 8 and 10 mixed by Ben Grosse and Nikos Lyras. Nikos Lyras: guitars, keyboards, keyboard and rhythm programming; Ernest Williamson: keyboards and rhythm programming; Slice Tee: DJ/scratching; Dave Smith: bass; Steve Potts: drums, percussion; Pat Register, Najee: saxophone; background vocals and vocal arrangements: The Ridgeway Sisters
Track 4 – arranged and produced by The Characters (Troy Taylor and Charles Farrar), with additional production by Ben Grosse. Recorded and mixed by Ben Grosse. Curtis Matthewson: guitars; Luis Resto: keyboards; Troy Taylor: drums, percussion, background vocals; Couture & The Flow: background vocals

Charts

Weekly charts

References

1992 albums
Wendy Moten albums
Albums produced by Ron Fair
EMI Records albums
SBK Records albums
Albums produced by Troy Taylor